Robert Draper (born November 15, 1959) is an American journalist, and author of Do Not Ask What Good We Do: Inside the U.S. House of Representatives. He is a correspondent for GQ and a contributor to The New York Times Magazine. Previously, he worked for Texas Monthly.

Background and education
Draper attended Westchester High School in Houston, Texas. He is the grandson of Leon Jaworski, who served as a special prosecutor during the Watergate scandal. Draper was active in high school debate. He attended the University of Texas at Austin where he majored in the Plan II Honors program and wrote for the university newspaper The Daily Texan.

Career

Journalism career
After graduation from the University of Texas at Austin, Draper wrote for the Austin Chronicle.

In 1991, Draper joined the staff of the Texas Monthly where he worked along with Gregory Curtis, Jim Shahin, Joe Nick Patoski, Gary Cartwright, Evan Smith and the periodical publisher Michael Levy. In July 1992, Draper publishes his interview in Texas Monthly on Cormac McCarthy, who at that time became known for his novel All the Pretty Horses. In September 1996, Draper had relocated to Venice where he worked for four months for the Hadrian's Walls.

In 2007, Draper became a contributing writer to National Geographic and in 2008 joined The New York Times Magazine. As a writer for The New York Times, Draper had an exclusive interview with Wendy Davis, prior to her even becoming a politician.

He also is an editor of GQ magazine.

As a journalist and editor he had met many known people, including novelists such as Stephen Harrigan, Mary Karr and Carol Dawson.

In 2019, Draper and Cédric Gerbehaye, a Belgian photographer, had traveled to Bolivia, to write about lithium.

Writing career
Draper's career as a writer dates back to 1990 when he wrote his first novel Armbrister. Back then, Kathy Robbins was his literary agent, who promised to find him a publisher, but failed to do so. During the same year. Draper had written Rolling Stone Magazine: The Uncensored History, which was read by Julia Null, wife of Evan Smith, and was published by Doubleday the same year. In 1994, Draper moved to Palacios, Texas for three months, where he wrote another novel, Under Mistletoe which, just like his Armbrister didn't get published.

Draper's literary success became apparent when he became an author of Dead Certain: The Presidency of George W. Bush, a chronicle of the Bush administration from 2001 to 2007. The New York Times reviewed the book, writing that it gives "the reader an intimate sense of the president’s personality and how it informs his decision making." He has also written a novel Hadrian's Walls, published in 1999, which The New York Times called "deft and occasionally ingenious."

In April 2012, Draper published Do Not Ask What Good We Do: Inside the U.S. House of Representatives, which the Huffington Post described as "much-discussed and heavily-reported." Writing in the Wall Street Journal, ABC News senior political correspondent Jonathan Karl called the book "a refreshingly balanced account that captures the drama of one of Congress's most combative and maddeningly frustrating years in memory."

Personal life
Draper was married to Meg Littleton in the late 1990s and early 2000s.

On November 16, 2016, fellow journalist Kirsten Powers announced her engagement to Draper.

Bibliography

Books

Hadrian's walls, Knopf, 1999, 

 331 p.
 352 p. 
 246 p.
 496 p. 
 400 p.

Essays and reporting
 Kate del Castillo.

References

External links

Robert Draper Profile in the Austin Chronicle: " Writer at Large," May 14, 1999
Jonathan Karl in The Wall Street Journal on Do Not Ask What Good We Do
"Author Had Rare Access to Bush for 'Dead Certain' ". NPR Sep. 4, 2007.
"Kathleen Parker Fetes 'Brash' Author in Georgetown Home, Hems and Haws about Eliot Spitzer". "Mediabistro" May 2, 2012.

1959 births
Living people
American male journalists
20th-century American journalists
Place of birth missing (living people)
The New York Times writers
The New Yorker people
University of Texas at Austin College of Liberal Arts alumni
21st-century American journalists
20th-century American male writers
21st-century American male writers